Mariyam Shakeela may refer to:
 Mariyam Shakeela (politician), former government Minister for Health and Family and the Minister of Environment and Energy from Maldives
 Mariyam Shakeela (actress), Maldivian film actress

See also